Holt, Kentucky may refer to the following places in Kentucky:
Holt, Breckinridge County, Kentucky
Holt, Lawrence County, Kentucky
Holt, Muhlenberg County, Kentucky